This list of museums in Saxony shows the museums in the German federated state of Saxony by location in alphabetical order:

A 
 Adorf/Vogtl., Vogtlandkreis
 Bad Elster Spa Museum
 Adorf Museum
 Altenberg, Landkreis Sächsische Schweiz-Osterzgebirge
 Altenberg Mining Museum
 Annaberg-Buchholz, Erzgebirgskreis
 Adam Ries Museum
 Ore Mountain Museum and Gößner visitor mine
 Frohnauer Hammer Technology Museum
 Markus Röhling Stolln Visitor Mine, Frohnau
 Dorothea-Stolln Visitor Mine, Cunersdorf
 Experience Museum Manufaktur der Träume
 Ansprung, Erzgebirgskreis
 Heimatstube Ansprung
 Antonsthal, Erzgebirgskreis
 Silberwäsche Technology Museum
 Aue, Erzgebirgskreis
 Art Alt Aue Gallery
 Atelier Ernst Hecker
 Museum of the town of Aue
 Auerbach, Vogtlandkreis
 GöltzschtalGallery NikolaiChurch
 Heimatstuben Auerbach
 Museum Auerbach
 Mining Museum Maffeischächte
 Augustusburg, Landkreis Mittelsachsen
 Coach museum
 Motorcycle museum
 Game and Bird museums

B 
 Bad Brambach, Vogtlandkreis
 Heimatstube Bad Brambach
 Bad Düben, Landkreis Nordsachsen
 Düben Heath Countryside Museum
 Bad Gottleuba, Landkreis Sächsische Schweiz-Osterzgebirge
 Local History Museum Bad Gottleuba
 Medical History Exhibition
 Bad Muskau, Landkreis Görlitz
 Town and Park Museum
 Bad Schandau, Landkreis Sächsische Schweiz-Osterzgebirge
 Local History Museum
 Bad Schlema, Erzgebirgskreis
 „Markus Semmler’‘Visitor Mine
 Traditionsstätte des Sächsisch - Thüringischen Uranerzbergbaus (Museum Uranbergbau)
 Bannewitz, Landkreis Sächsische Schweiz-Osterzgebirge
 Nöthnitz Renaissance Castle Museum
 Bautzen, Landkreis Bautzen
 Alte WasserArt Bautzen
 Domschatzkammer St. Petri
 Budissin Gallery
 Bautzen Memorial
 Reichenturm
 Serbski Muzej
 Bautzen Town Museum
 Sternwarte Bautzen
 Großwelka Dinosaur Garden
 Kleinwelka Dinosaur Park
 Kleinwelka Miniature Park
 Belgern, Landkreis Nordsachsen
 Local History Museum
 Bernsdorf, Hoyerswerda
 Zeißholz Village Museum
 Bernstadt auf dem Eigen, Landkreis Görlitz
 Local History Museum
 Bischofswerda, Landkreis Bautzen
 Carl Lohse Gallery
 Borna, Landkreis Leipzig
 Gallery in Bürgerhaus
 Borna Town Museum
 Brand-Erbisdorf, Landkreis Mittelsachsen
 Industrial Museum
 Huthaus Einigkeit Museum
 Bartholomäus-Schacht Show Mine
 Braunsdorf, Landkreis Mittelsachsen
 Historic Weberei
 Breitenbrunn, Erzgebirgskreis
 Bergmännisches Traditionskabinett
 Mining Exhibition
 Burgstädt, Landkreis Mittelsachsen
 Historic Doctor’s Practice
 Town Museum

C 
Cämmerswalde
Show aeroplanes
 Chemnitz
 Saxon Railway Museum
 Museum of Saxon Vehicles
 Botanical Gardens, School of Biology
 Museum for Natural History
 New Saxon Gallery
 Roter Turm
 Chemnitz Art Collections
 Gunzenhauser Museum
 Chemnitz Castle Mining Museum
 Felsendome Rabenstein Show Mine
 Rabenstein Castle
 Information and Documentation Centre of the BStU
 German Games Museum
 Saxon Industrial Museum
 Rosenkranz Gallery
 Henry van de Velde Museum in the Villa Esche
 Chemnitz Zoo
 Colditz, Landkreis Leipzig
 Colditz Escape Museum
 Johann David Köhler Haus
 Colditz Town Museum
 Coswig, Landkreis Meißen
 Karrasburg Museum
 Villa Teresa
 Crimmitschau, Landkreis Zwickau
 WestSaxon Textilmuseum
 Agrar- and Open-Air Museum
 Sternwarte Crimmitschau
 Cunewalde, Landkreis Bautzen
 Exhibition Historicr Zimmermannswerkzeuge Gaststätte „Kleene Schänke’‘
 Haus des Gastes „Dreiseitenhof’‘ mit Oldtimer Museum
 Polenz Museum Cunewalde
 School Museum Grundschule „Friedrich Schiller’‘

D 
 Dahlen, Landkreis Nordsachsen
 Local History Museum
 Delitzsch, Landkreis Nordsachsen
 Castle Museum Delitzsch
 Schulze-Delitzsch Haus
 Dippoldiswalde, Landkreis Sächsische Schweiz-Osterzgebirge
 Lohgerber-, Town and County Museum
 Museum OsterzgebirgsGallery
 Dittelsdorf, Landkreis Görlitz
 Local History Museum
 Dittmannsdorf, Landkreis Mittelsachsen
 Geringswalde Local History and Farm Museum
 Dohna, Landkreis Sächsische Schweiz-Osterzgebirge
 Local History Museum
 Dommitzsch, Landkreis Nordsachsen
 Museum of the town of Dommitzsch
 Dorf Wehlen, Landkreis Sächsische Schweiz-Osterzgebirge
 Miniaturausstellung „Kleine Sächsische Schweiz’‘
 Dorfchemnitz, Landkreis Mittelsachsen
 Technology Museum „Eisenhammer’‘
 Döbeln, Landkreis Mittelsachsen
 Döbeln Town Museum
 Dresden, state capital
 SLUB Dresden Book Museum
 German Hygiene Museum DHMD
 Dresdner Football Museum
 Bw Dresden-Altstadt Railway Museum
 Erich Kästner Museum
 Dresden Bicycle Museum
 Dresden Fort
 Bautzner Straße Memorial, Dresden
 Münchner Platz Memorial, Dresden
 Hofmühle Dresden
 KleinFarm Museum Reitzendorf
 KraftWerk – Dresden Energy Museum
 Arthaus Dresden
 Landesmuseum for Pre-History Dresden (State Museum for Pre-History)
 Leonhardi Museum
 Heliotype Workshop Museum
 Bundeswehr Military History Museum
 Windberg Railway History Museum
 Dresden Panometer
 Plattenbau Museum
 Collections and Artbesitz der TU Dresden
 School Museum Dresden
 Sparkasse Museum Dresden
 State Art Collections, Dresden
 Gemäldegalerie Alte Meister (Old Masters Painting Gallery) 
 Galerie Neue Meister (New Masters Gallery)
 Kupferstich-Kabinett (Collection of Prints, Drawings and Photographs)
 Grünes Gewölbe (Green Vault) with the Historic and the New Green Vault
 Mathematisch-Physikalischer Salon (Royal Cabinet of Mathematical and Physical Instruments)
 Rüstkammer (Armoury) with the Turkish Chamber
 Porzellansammlung (Porcelain Collection)
 Münzkabinett (Coin Cabinet)
 Skulpturensammlung (Sculpture Collection)
 Kunstgewerbemuseum (Arts and Crafts Museum) Pillnitz Castle
 Museum für Völkerkunde Dresden (Ethnographical Museum Dresden)
 Museum für Sächsische Volkskunst and Puppentheatersammlung (Saxon Folk Art Museum and Puppet Theatre Collection)
 State Natural History Collections, Dresden
 Museum for Mineralogy and Geology, Dresden
 State Museum of Zoology, Dresden
 Dresden City Museum
 Carl Maria von Weber Museum
 Heimat- and Palitzschmuseum Prohlis
 Kraszewski Museum
 Kügelgenhaus – Museum der Dresdner Romantik
 Schillerhäuschen
 Dresden Town Museum (STMD)
 Dresden City Art Gallery
 Technical Collections of the City of Dresden (TSD) in Striesen
 Dresden Tram Museum
 Dresden Transport Museum
 → see also: Museums in Dresden

E 
 Ebersbach, Landkreis Görlitz
 Firefighting Museum
 Local History Museum Humboldtbaude, auf dem Schlechteberg
 Ehrenfriedersdorf, Erzgebirgskreis
 Mining and Greifenstein Museum
 Zinngrube Ehrenfriedersdorf
 Eibau, Landkreis Görlitz
 Faktorenhof
 Local History and Humboldt Museum, on the Beckenberg
 Eibenstock, Erzgebirgskreis
 Town Local History Museum, Eibenstock
 Stickerei-Schauwerkstatt Eibenstock
 Eilenburg, Landkreis Nordsachsen
 Eilenburg Town Museum
 Erlbach, Vogtlandkreis
 Vogtland Village Museum

F 
 Falkenstein/Vogtl., Vogtlandkreis
 Falkenstein Local History Museum
 Frankenberg, Landkreis Mittelsachsen
 Frankenberger Fahrzeugmuseum
 Museum of the town of Frankenberg
 Collection for Paper and Printing History
 Thonet Museum
 Frauenstein, Landkreis Mittelsachsen
 Gottfried Silbermann Museum
 Frauwalde Landkreis Leipzig
 Museum for Pre- and Early History
 Freiberg, Landkreis Mittelsachsen
 The Freiberg Silver Mine
 Technical Collections of the Freiberg Mining Academy
 Mineralogical and Mineral Deposit Collection
 Natural History Museum
 Palaeontology and Stratigraphic Collection
 Town and Mining Museum Freiberg
 Kavernenkraftwerk Drei-Brüder-Schacht mit InformationsCentre ‘‘WassErleben’‘
 Freital, Landkreis Sächsische Schweiz-Osterzgebirge
 Haus der Heimat
 Frohburg, Landkreis Leipzig
 Museum in Castle Frohburg

G 
 Geising, Landkreis Sächsische Schweiz-Osterzgebirge
 Silberstollen Show Mine
 Geithain, Landkreis Leipzig
 Local History Museum
 Gelenau, Erzgebirgskreis
 German Strumpfmuseum
 Geyer, Erzgebirgskreis
 Local History Museum in Wachtturm
 Glashütte, Landkreis Sächsische Schweiz-Osterzgebirge
 Clock Museum
 Glauchau, Landkreis Zwickau
 Museum and Art Collection
 Gluchowe Town Gallery Art
 Gneisenaustadt Schildau, Landkreis Nordsachsen
 Gneisenau Memorial
 Görlitz
 see Görlitzer Museum
 Gohrisch, Landkreis Sächsische Schweiz-Osterzgebirge
 Cunnersdorf Local History Museum
 Graupa, Landkreis Sächsische Schweiz-Osterzgebirge
 Richard Wagner Museum
 Grethen, Landkreis Leipzig
 Firefighting Museum
 Grillenburg, Landkreis Sächsische Schweiz-Osterzgebirge
 Forestry and Hunting Museum, Grillenburg Castle
 Grimma, Landkreis Leipzig
 Grimma County Museum
 Grimma Town Gallery
 Göschenhaus
 Groitzsch, Landkreis Leipzig
 Groitzsch Town Museum
 Großbothen, Landkreis Leipzig
 Wilhelm Ostwald Memorial
 Großenhain, Landkreis Meißen
Old Latin School Museum
 Großolbersdorf, Erzgebirgskreis
 Museum of Number Plates
 Großpösna, Landkreis Leipzig
 Botanical Gardens for Medicinal and Herbal Plants
 Großröhrsdorf, Landkreis Bautzen
 Local History Museum
 Technology Museum
 Großschönau, Landkreis Görlitz
 German Damast- and Frottiermuseum
 Motorcycle Veterans and Technology Museum
 Großzschepa, Landkreis Leipzig
 Local History Museum
 Grüna, Landkreis Zwickau
 Ständige Gedenkausstellung Ernst Georg
 Grünhainichen, Erzgebirgskreis
 Permanent Exhibitions
 Grünhain-Beierfeld, Erzgebirgskreis
 Red Cross Museum, Beierfeld
 Herkules Frisch GlückShow Mine, Waschleithe

H 
 Hainichen, Landkreis Mittelsachsen
 Gellert Museum
 Hainichen Local History Museum
 Hartenstein, Landkreis Zwickau
 Stein Castle Museum 
 Hartmannsdorf-Reichenau, Landkreis Sächsische Schweiz-Osterzgebirge
 Reichenau Weichelt Mill
 Heidenau, Landkreis Sächsische Schweiz-Osterzgebirge
 Großsedlitz French Garden
 Hermsdorf, Landkreis Sächsische Schweiz-Osterzgebirge
 Farming & Local History Museum
 Herrnhut, Landkreis Görlitz
 Exhibition der Evangelischen Brüder-Unität
 Herrnhut Local History Museum
 Herrnhut Folk Art Museum
 Hirschfelde, Landkreis Görlitz
 Technology Monument & Museum Kraftwerk Hirschfelde
 Hohburg, Landkreis Leipzig
 Steinarbeiterhaus Museum
 Hohenstein-Ernstthal, Landkreis Zwickau
 Textil- and Rennsportmuseum
 Karl May Haus
 Buntes Holz Museum
 Hohnstein, Landkreis Sächsische Schweiz-Osterzgebirge
 Castle Museum Hohnstein
 Holtendorf, Landkreis Görlitz
 Schlesisch-Oberlausitzer Village Museum
 Hoyerswerda, Hoyerswerda
 Hoyerswerda Town Museum
 Trachtenhaus Jatzwauk
 Hundshübel, Erzgebirgskreis
 Nadlerhaus
 Höfgen, Landkreis Leipzig
 Wassermühle Höfgen

I

J
 Johanngeorgenstadt, Erzgebirgskreis
 Lehr- and Show Mine
 Pferdegöpel Johanngeorgenstadt
 Jöhstadt, Erzgebirgskreis
 PreßnitzValley Railway

K 
 Kamenz
 Lessing Museum
 Museum der Westlausitz
 Kauschwitz, Vogtlandkreis
 Memorial Flieshalle
 Kirschau, Landkreis Bautzen
 Körse Castle Museum
 Klingenthal, Vogtlandkreis
 Music and Winter Sports Museum
 Knappenrode, Hoyerswerda
 Lusatian Mining Museum
 Feuerstättenmuseum
 LG Lusatian Grubenbahn e. V.
 Kohren-Sahlis, Landkreis Leipzig
 Pottery Museum
 Gnandstein Castle (in the village of Gnandstein)
 Königshain, Landkreis Görlitz
 Königshain Granite Quarry Museum
 Königshain Castle Complex
 Königstein, Landkreis Sächsische Schweiz-Osterzgebirge
 Königstein Fort Museum
 Krebes, Vogtlandkreis
 Hermann Vogel Haus
 Krebes Museum House
 Kriebethal, Landkreis Mittelsachsen
 Kriebstein Castle Museum
 Krippen, Landkreis Sächsische Schweiz-Osterzgebirge
 Friedrich Gottlob Keller Memorial
 Kurort Jonsdorf, Landkreis Görlitz
 Weberstube Jonsdorf
 Kurort Oberwiesenthal, Erzgebirgskreis
 Ski and Local History Museum
 Cranzahl, Oberwiesenthal
 Kühren, Landkreis Leipzig
 Village and Farm Museum

L 
 Landwüst, Vogtlandkreis
 Vogtland Open-Air Museum
 Lauenstein, Landkreis Sächsische Schweiz-Osterzgebirge
 Castle Museum Lauenstein
 Leipzig
 Egyptian Museum of the University of Leipzig
 Museum of Antiquities of the University of Leipzig
 Automatik Museum der Hochschule for Technik, Wirtschaft and Kultur Leipzig
 German Kleingärtnermuseum
 German Book and Schriftmuseum
 Railway Museum Bayerischer Bahnhof zu Leipzig
 Grassi Museum
 Museum of Applied Arts
 Museum of Ethnography
 Museum of Musical Instruments of the University of Leipzig
 Gallery for Zeitgenössische Art
 Memorial Museum in der „Runden Ecke’‘
 Gohliser Schlösschen
 Kamera- and Fotomuseum Leipzig
 Leipzig Children’s Museum
 1813 Völkerschlacht Memorialmuseum
 MitToy Museum (Leipzig)
 Museum der bildenden Künste
 Museum for DruckArt
 Museum in Mendelssohn Haus
 Museum in Schumann Haus
 Leipzig Natural History Museum
 Leipzig Panometer
 Saxon Apothecary Museum, Leipzig
 Saxon Psychiatry Museum, Leipzig
 Leipzig School Museum
 Leipzig-Möckern Tram Museum
 Stadtgeschichtliches Museum
 Zum Arabischen Coffe Baum Museum 
 Schillerhaus (Leipzig)
 Leipzig Sports Museum
 VölkerschlachtMonument / FORUM 1813
 Zeitgeschichtliches Forum Leipzig
 Leisnig, Landkreis Mittelsachsen
 Leisnig Arctic-Alpine Botanical Garden
 Staatlicher Castlebetrieb Castle Mildenstein
 Lengefeld, Erzgebirgskreis
 Museum Technology Monument
 Lengenfeld, Vogtlandkreis
 Firefighting Museum
 Local History Museum
 Lichtenstein, Landkreis Zwickau
 Daetz-Centrum
 1st Saxon Coffee Pot Museum, (Lichtenstein, OT Heinrichsort)
 Museum of the town of Lichtenstein
 Doll and Toy Museum
 Lichtenwalde, Landkreis Mittelsachsen
 Castle Lichtenwalde
 Liebenau, Landkreis Sächsische Schweiz-Osterzgebirge
 Liebenau Farm Museum
 Liebstadt, Landkreis Sächsische Schweiz-Osterzgebirge
 Kuckuckstein Castle Museum
 Limbach-Oberfrohna, Landkreis Zwickau
 Industry and Local History Museum
 Heimatstube „Fronfeste’‘
 Hoyersheimathaus
 Lindigtvorwerk, Landkreis Leipzig
 Mühlenmuseum Lindigtmühle
 Lugau, Erzgebirgskreis
 Local History Museum
 Löbau, Landkreis Görlitz
 Town Museum

M 
 Marienberg, Erzgebirgskreis
 Town and Local History Museum
 Markersdorf, Landkreis Görlitz
 Village Museum Markersdorf
 Markkleeberg, Landkreis Leipzig
 German Agricultural Museum Markkleeberg
 Markneukirchen, Vogtlandkreis
 Musical Instrument Museum
 Collection of mechanical music instruments
 Markranstädt, Landkreis Leipzig
 Markranstädt Local History Museum
 Maxen, Landkreis Sächsische Schweiz-Osterzgebirge
 Maxen Local History Museum
 Maxen Lime Kiln Museum
 Meerane, Landkreis Zwickau
 Local History Museum
 Art-In Gallery
 Meißen, Landkreis Meißen
 Albrechtsburg Museum
 Pianoforte Museum
 Schauhalle
 Town Museum Meißen
 Mittweida, Landkreis Mittelsachsen
 Museum of the town of Mittweida
 Morgenröthe-Rautenkranz, Vogtlandkreis
 German Space Exhibition
 Moritzburg, Landkreis Meißen
 State Museum for Animals
 Käthe Kollwitz Memorial
 Moritzburg Castle Museum
 Saxon State Stud, Moritzburg
 Mutzschen, Landkreis Leipzig
 Town Museum Mutzschen
 Mügeln, Landkreis Nordsachsen
 DGB Döllnitzbahn GmbH
 Local History Museum
 Local History Museum
 Müglitztal, Landkreis Sächsische Schweiz-Osterzgebirge
 Local History Museum 
 Lime Kiln Museum 
 Lindenmuseum Clara Schumann in 
 Weesenstein Castle
 Mylau, Vogtlandkreis
 Mylau Castle Museum
 Mülsen St. Jacob, Landkreis Zwickau
 Gold and Silversmith Museum
 Mölkau, Landkreis Leipzig
 Camera  and Photography Museum

N 
 Naundorf, Landkreis Sächsische Schweiz-Osterzgebirge
 Robert Sterl Haus
 Naunhof, Landkreis Leipzig
 Tower Clock Museum
 Neißeaue, OT Zodel, Landkreis Görlitz
 Traugott Gerber Museum
 Neschwitz, Landkreis Bautzen
 Old Castle, Neschwitz
 Netzschkau, Vogtlandkreis
 Netzschkau Castle Museum
 Neuensalz, Vogtlandkreis
 Neuensalz Chapel
 Neugersdorf, Landkreis Görlitz
 Neugersdorf Local History Museum
 Neuhausen/Erzgeb., Landkreis Mittelsachsen
Ore Mountain Glassworks Museum
 Neuhausen Nutcracker Museum
‘‘Alte Stuhlfabrik’‘ Technology Museum
Motorcycle Exhibition
 Neukirch, Landkreis Bautzen
 Neukirch Local History Museum
 Neumark, Vogtlandkreis
 Neumark School Museum
 Neusalza-Spremberg, Landkreis Görlitz
 BauMonument and Local History Museum Reiterhaus
 Neustadt in Saxony, Landkreis Sächsische Schweiz-Osterzgebirge
 Local History Museum
 Niedercunnersdorf, Landkreis Görlitz
 Local History Museum „Alte Weberstube’‘
 Niederwiesa, Landkreis Mittelsachsen
 Firefighting Museum
 Niesky, Landkreis Görlitz
 Museum at the Zinzendorfplatz
 Nossen, Landkreis Meißen
 Altzella Abbey Park
 Nossen State Castle

O 
 Obercunnersdorf, Landkreis Görlitz
 Bockwindmühle Kottmarsdorf
 Faktorenhaus „Alte Brennerei’‘ and Heimatstuben
 Friseurmuseum Kottmarsdorf
 „Schunkelhaus’‘
 Oberlungwitz, Landkreis Zwickau
 Oberlungwitz Local History Museum
 Oederan, Landkreis Mittelsachsen
 Gahlenz Village Museum
 Historic Weaving webMUSEUM
 Klein-Erzgebirge
 Oelsnitz/Erzgeb., Erzgebirgskreis
 Mining Museum
 Oelsnitz/Vogtl., Vogtlandkreis
 Teppich- and Local History Castle Museum Voigtsberg
 Olbernhau, Erzgebirgskreis
 Museums of the town of Olbernhau
 Museum Saigerhütte Olbernhau
 Oschatz, Landkreis Nordsachsen
  Oschatz Town and Coach Museum
 Gallery at the Museum
 Oybin, Landkreis Görlitz
 Castle and Monastery, see Oybin (mountain)

P 
 Panschwitz-Kuckau, Landkreis Bautzen
 Cisinski-Memorial
 Pegau, Landkreis Leipzig
 Museum of the town of Pegau
 Ziegelei Erbs Technology Monument
 Pirna, Landkreis Sächsische Schweiz-Osterzgebirge
 DDR Museum Pirna
 Dampfbahn Sächsische Schweiz
 Town Museum
 Plauen, Vogtlandkreis
 Embroidery Machine Museum
 Pobershau, Erzgebirgskreis
 Show Mine
 Pockau, Erzgebirgskreis
 Technology Museum Ölmühle
 Polenz, Landkreis Leipzig
 Heimathaus
 Pulsnitz, Landkreis Bautzen
 Town Museum
 Pöhla, Erzgebirgskreis
 Pöhla Visitor Mine

Q

R
 Rabenau, Landkreis Sächsische Schweiz-Osterzgebirge
 German Chair-making Museum 
 Radeberg, Landkreis Bautzen
 Klippenstein Castle Museum
 Radebeul, Landkreis Meißen
 Hoflößnitz Historic Vineyard
 Karl May Museum (Villa Bärenfett)
 Radebeul Narrow Gauge Railway Museum and Radebeul Heritage Railway
 DDR Museum Zeitreise
 Radebeul Local History Museum
 StadtGallery Radebeul
 Radeburg, Landkreis Meißen
 Local History Museum
 Rammenau, Landkreis Bautzen
 Johann Gottlieb Fichte Memorial
 Staatlicher Castlebetrieb BarockCastle Rammenau
 Reichenau, Landkreis Sächsische Schweiz-Osterzgebirge
 Illingmühle
 Reichenbach, Landkreis Görlitz
 Ackerbürgermuseum Reichenbach
 Reichenbach, Vogtlandkreis
 Neuberin Museum
 Reichwalde/Oberlausitz, Landkreis Görlitz
 1. Technische Schauanlage for Kübel- and Geländewagen e.V. (Geländewagenmuseum)
 Reichenbach-Reichenau, Landkreis Bautzen
 Reichenau/Vogtland Local History Museum
 Reinsdorf
 Mining and Local History Museum
 Brewery Museum
 Riesa, Landkreis Meißen
 Municipal Centre for History and Art
 Rietschen, Landkreis Görlitz
 Erlichthof
 Rittersgrün, Erzgebirgskreis
 Saxon Narrow Gauge Railway Museum
 Technology Museum
 Rochlitz, Landkreis Mittelsachsen
 Rochlitz Castle Museum
 Rochsburg, Landkreis Mittelsachsen
 Castle Museum Rochsburg
 Rodewisch, Vogtlandkreis
 Göltzsch Museum
 Sternwarte and Planetarium
 Rohne, Landkreis Görlitz
 Sorbian Heimatstube Rohne (Sorbenstube)
 Rothenburg, Landkreis Görlitz
 Local History Museum Rothenburg/Oberlausitz
 Rothenburg/Oberlausitz Aviation Technology Museum
 Roßwein, Landkreis Mittelsachsen
 Roßwein Local History Museum

S 
 Sayda, Landkreis Mittelsachsen
 Ore Mountain Local History Museum
 Scharfenberg, Landkreis Meißen
 Local History Museum
 Scharfenstein, Erzgebirgskreis
 Scharfenstein Castle Experience /Saxony
 Schellerhau, Landkreis Sächsische Schweiz-Osterzgebirge
 Schellerhau Botanical Gardens
 Weißeritztal Railway
 Schirgiswalde, Landkreis Bautzen
 Landessternwarte
 Local History Museum „Carl Swoboda’‘
 Schkeuditz, Landkreis Leipzig
 Museum of the town of Schkeuditz
 Schmannewitz, Landkreis Nordsachsen
 Farm Museum Schmannewitz
 Schmölln-Putzkau, Landkreis Bautzen
 Local History Museum Schmölln
 Schneeberg, Erzgebirgskreis
 Museum for Miner's Folk Art (Museum für bergmännische Volkskunst)
 Technology Museum
 Schmorsdorf near Maxen, Landkreis Sächsische Schweiz-Osterzgebirge
 Lindenmuseum Clara Schumann in Schmorsdorf, Saxonys kleinstes freistehendes Museum
 Schönbach, Landkreis Leipzig
 Schönbach Village Museum
 Schönborn-Dreiwerden, Landkreis Mittelsachsen
 Visitor Mine „Alte Hoffnung Erbstolln’‘
 Schöneck/Vogtl., Vogtlandkreis
 Schöneck Brewery Museum
 Local History Museum
 Schönfeld, Erzgebirgskreis
 Visitor Mine
 Schönfels, Landkreis Zwickau
 Schönfels Castle Museum
 Schönheide, Erzgebirgskreis
 MBS Museumsbahn Schönheide e. V. (Narrow Gauge Railroad Museum of Schönheide)
 Bürsten- und Heimatmuseum (Brush- and Local History Museum)
 Schwarzbach, Landkreis Mittelsachsen
 Museum for Volksarchitektur and bäuerliche Kultur
 Schwarzenberg, Erzgebirgskreis
 Schwarzenberg Railway Museum
 Schwarzenberg Castle Museum
 Sebnitz, Landkreis Sächsische Schweiz-Osterzgebirge
 Afrikahaus
 Sebnitzer Artblumen- and Local History Museum „Prof. Alfred Meiche’‘
 Urzeitpark Sebnitz
 Seifersdorf, Landkreis Meißen
  Seifersdorf Castle and Park
 Seiffen, Erzgebirgskreis
 Ore Mountain Open-Air Museum
 Ore Mountain Toy Museum
 Seifhennersdorf, Landkreis Görlitz
 Railway Museum – Collection by the Frey Family
 Doll Museum
 Karasek Museum
 Sohland an der Spree, Landkreis Bautzen
 Deutsch-Tschechisches Forstmuseum, Teilbereich Oberlausitzer Forstmuseum
 Local History Museum „Old Weberhaus’‘
 St. Egidien, Landkreis Zwickau
 Local History Museum in Gerth-Turm
 Stadt Wehlen, Landkreis Sächsische Schweiz-Osterzgebirge
 Local History Museum and Botanical Garden
 Steinigtwolmsdorf, Landkreis Bautzen
 Weifa Local History Museum
 Stolpen, Landkreis Sächsische Schweiz-Osterzgebirge
 Stolpen Castle
 Stolpen Town Museum
 Syrau, Vogtlandkreis
 Drachenhöhle
 Windmühle

T 
 Tannenbergsthal, Vogtlandkreis
 Visitor Mine „Grube Tannenberg’‘
 Industrybrache NC-Artlederwerk
 Taucha, Landkreis Leipzig
 Town Local History Museum
 Tharandt, Landkreis Sächsische Schweiz-Osterzgebirge
 ForstBotanical Gardens Tharandt
 Torgau, Landkreis Nordsachsen
 County Museum Torgau
 2. Saxon Landesausstellung 2004

U

V

W 
 Waldenburg, Landkreis Zwickau
 Local History Museum and Naturalienkabinett
 Waldheim, Landkreis Mittelsachsen
 Local History Museum of the town of Waldheim
 Saxon Strafvollzugsmuseum
 Waltersdorf, Landkreis Görlitz
 Volkskunde- and Mühlenmuseum
 Wartha, Landkreis Bautzen
 School Museum K.A. Kocor
 Waschleithe, Erzgebirgskreis
 Show Mine „Herkules-Frisch-Glück’‘
 Weißenberg, Landkreis Bautzen
 Museum „Alte Pfefferküchlerei’‘
 Weißwasser, Landkreis Görlitz
 Weißwasser Glass Museum
 Muskau Forest Railway
 Werdau, Landkreis Zwickau
 Town and Dampfmaschinenmuseum
 Wermsdorf, Landkreis Nordsachsen
 Museum Hubertusburg
 Wilthen, Landkreis Bautzen
 Heimatstube
 Wohlhausen, Vogtlandkreis
 Hüttels Musikwerk-Exhibition
 Wolkenstein, Erzgebirgskreis
 Local History Museum
 Wurzen, Landkreis Leipzig
 Kulturgeschichtliches Museum
 Town Gallery at the Markt
 Wyhratal, Landkreis Leipzig
 Volkskundemuseum Wyhra

X

Y

Z 
 Zabeltitz, Landkreis Meißen
 Zabeltitz Farm Museum
 Zeißholz, Landkreis Bautzen
 Zeißholz Village Museum
 Zinnwald-Georgenfeld, Landkreis Sächsische Schweiz-Osterzgebirge
 Vereinigt Zwitterfeld zu Zinnwald
 Museum Huthaus
 Zittau, Landkreis Görlitz
 Open-Air Museum Klosterhof
 Gallery Artlade
 Historics Stadtarchiv
 Church and KulturCentre St. Johannis
 Church zum Heiligen Kreuz
 KulturHistorics Museum
 Museum for Natural History des Zittauer Landes
 Zöblitz, Erzgebirgskreis
 Serpentin- and Local History Museum Zöblitz
 Schmiede and Heimatstube Ansprung
 alte Schule Sorgau
 Zschopau, Erzgebirgskreis
 Visitor mine „Heilige Dreifaltigkeit’‘
 Local History Museum in Wildeck Castle
Zwickau, Landkreis Zwickau
ArtCollections Zwickau
Kultur- and stadtgeschichtliches Museum Priesterhäuser Zwickau
August-Horch Museum Zwickau
Robert Schumann House
Agricultural Museum Castle Blankenhain
 Zwota, Vogtlandkreis
 Heimatstube Zwota
 Zwönitz, Erzgebirgskreis
 Gebhardtsche Collection
 Papiermühle Niederzwönitz
 Local History Museum Knochenstampfe (in the village of Dorfchemnitz)

External links 

!List of Museums in Saxony
Saxony